The Treaty of London in 1864 resulted in Great Britain ceding the United States of the Ionian Islands to Greece. Britain had held an amical protectorate over the islands since the 1815 Treaty of Paris.

The federated United States of the Ionian Islands included seven islands off the coasts of Epirus and the Peloponnese, that had remained in Venetian hands until 1797 and escaped Ottoman rule. Of the seven, six lay in the Ionian Sea, off the western coast of the Greek mainland. These six states were Corfù (Kerkyra), Ithaca, Paxò, Cephalonia, Zante (Zakynthos) and Santa Maura (Lefkas). Cerigo (Kythera) was also a state of the federation, although it is situated southeast of the Peloponnese.

Ever since Greece had become independent from the Ottoman Empire in 1832, the people of the Ionian islands had pressed for enosis with Greece. At a Cabinet meeting in 1862, British Foreign Secretary Palmerston decided to cede the islands to Greece. This policy was also favoured by Queen Victoria. The practical reasoning was that maintenance of ownership in the area was too expensive. Besides, the islands did not have great strategic importance; Britain would still maintain a strategic presence in the Mediterranean from the island of Malta.

The decision to cede the islands was also influenced by the accession to the Greek throne of the Danish prince George, a committed Anglophile. Indeed, in a referendum in November 1862, the Greeks had elected Queen Victoria's second son, Prince Alfred, as their King, partly in the hope of receiving the Ionian Islands.

After long negotiations with Greece, the Treaty of London was signed by Greek delegate Charilaos Trikoupis on 29 March 1864. On 2 May 1864 the British departed and the Ionian Islands became three provinces of the Kingdom of Greece, although Britain retained use of the port on Corfu.

This can be seen as the first example of voluntary decolonization by Britain.

See also
Treaties of London

Further reading
 Anderson M. S. The Eastern Question 1774–1923, A Study in the International Relations (London, 1983).
 Paschalidi, Maria. "Constructing Ionian identities: the Ionian Islands in British official discourses; 1815-1864" (PhD dissertation. UCL (University College London), 2010) online.
 Xenos, Stephanos Th. East and West: A Diplomatic History of the Annexation of the Ionian Islands to the Kingdom of Greece (Trübner, 1865) online.

External links

Details of the 1864 Treaty of London

History of Greece (1863–1909)
London (1864), Treaty of
1864 treaties
1864 in London
London (1864), Treaty of
Treaties involving territorial changes
Greece–United Kingdom relations
History of the Ionian Islands
1864 in British law
March 1864 events
Decolonization